Belaet Tira Baralida is a travelogue by Dr.Tara Nath Sharma. It was published in 1970 (2026 BS) by Sajha Prakashan and won the prestigious Madan Puraskar for that year.  The author wrote the book under the pen name Tanasarma. The book was reprinted by Manjari Publication in 2017 (2074 BS).

Plot 
Belaet is the Nepali name for Britain. This book is a memoir of his travel in the United Kingdom and one of the earliest modern travelogue in Nepali literature. Born and raised in the remote village of Barabote in Ilam, Taranath's arrival in Kathmandu from there was a big deal at that time. The book includes the highs and lows of the author's travel in Britain.

Awards 
The book won the prestigious Madan Puraskar for the year 1967.

See also 

 Alikhit
 Basain
 Ghamka Pailaharu
 Shirishko Phool

References 

Madan Puraskar-winning works
Nepalese non-fiction books
Nepalese non-fiction literature
Nepalese travel books